No. 621 Squadron RAF was a reconnaissance squadron of the Royal Air Force during World War II, flying from Somaliland and Aden.

History
No. 621 Squadron RAF was at Port Reitz, Kenya, on 12 September 1943 as a general reconnaissance unit. The most unusual sortie flown by the squadron was in November 1943, when it had to look for four thousand stolen camels on behalf of the army. In November the squadron converted to Warwicks and started in Operation Sunburn, looking for illegal immigrants into Palestine. In April to squadron moved to Palestine and converted to Lancasters. Shortly after it had completed that conversion the squadron was disbanded at RAF Ein Shemer by being re-numbered to No. 18 Squadron RAF on 1 September 1946.

The present 621 Volunteer Gliding Squadron has no links with 621 Squadron, and in fact traces its lines back to No. 87 Glider School RAF.

Aircraft operated

Squadron bases

Commanding officers

References
Notes

Bibliography

External links
 History of 621 Squadron on RAF website
 Airfields, operating dates and aircraft types for No.621 Squadron RAF, 1939–45
 History of No.'s 621–650 Squadrons at RAF Web

Aircraft squadrons of the Royal Air Force in World War II
621 Squadron
Reconnaissance units and formations of the Royal Air Force
Military units and formations established in 1943
Military units and formations disestablished in 1946
Military units and formations in Aden in World War II
R